Intent On Contentment is the 2004 album by Jimmy Ibbotson. Ibbotson is a former member of the Nitty Gritty Dirt Band.

Track listing
"Shower Call" (Jimmy Ibbotson, Jeff Hanna) - 3:06
"Witchita Town" (Tim Shields) - 3:21
"Bob Dylan's Dream" (Bob Dylan) - 4:35
"Coyote" (Jimmy Ibbotson) - 4:16
"Do You Want Me To Love You" (Jimmy Ibbotson) - 2:28
"Nun and Painter" (Jimmy Ibbotson) - 3:31
"Warrior's Prayer" (Jimmy Ibbotson) - 4:41
"The Lord's Prayer" (Jesus of Nazareth) - 2:44
"Intent On Contentment" (Jimmy Ibbotson) - 3:49 
"Palo Escopeta" (Jimmy Ibbotson, Bob Carpenter) - 4:08
"Heart That I Found" (Jimmy Ibbotson, John H. Evans) - 4:31
"Land That Time Forgot" (Jimmy Ibbotson) - 3:35
"Rosa Bella" (Jimmy Ibbotson) - 2:52
"Mr. Bo Dietl" (J. J. Walker, Jimmy Ibbotson) - 1:39
"Skunk's Night Out" (Jimmy Ibbotson) - 1:57

Personnel
Jimmie Ibbotson
Bob Dylan's Dream
 Harmony Vocal by BZ who is now Mrs. Al Palubinski
Warrior's Prayer - Wild Jimbos
Ibbo - Lead vocal, Guitar
Salebo - High String & 12 string guitar, Harmonies
Rattbo - Harmonies
Harry "Bruckbo" Buckner - Bass
Scottbo Bennett - Electric guitar
Palo Express
Musical track created by Bob Carpenter

Production
Producer - Ibby (Jimmy Ibbotson)

Track descriptions
"Shower Call" uses the melody of "One Christmas Tree" by the Nitty Gritty Dirt Band. The lyric imagine a phone call to estranged loved one where they decide to reconcile. The instruments used are electric guitar and drum. 
"Witchita Town" is about regretting the end of past relationships, but moving forward to settle down in a Witchita Town. The instruments are a keyboard and acoustic guitar.
"Bob Dylan's Dream" is a Dylan cover. It remembers the friends and optimism of his youth, recognizes the losses of both, and yearns for their return. Acoustic guitar provides the accompaniment.
"Coyote" with a new coat represents a man on the prowl in a new town. The woman he is interested is compared to a deer caught in the headlights. The accompaniment is flute, guitar and percussion. 
"Do You Want Me To Love You" offers to love you, because our friends think it is a good idea and  I think you are not bad to look at. The offer is kind, but a little pompous.  Accompaniment is guitar and drums
"Nun and Painter" describes a romance between a young nun who throws off her habit and has a romance with the young man who is painting her house.  It mentions the Six Days War being on the radio, which sets the time period as June 1967. The mention of the Shangri Las also places it in the mid sixties. Accompaniment is flute, drum, and bass guitar.
"Warrior's Prayer" begins with a couple lines from the song "Rivers of Babylon" sung a cappella  with the Wild Jimbos. The rest of the song is accompanied by acoustic and electric guitar and piano. The song is about a fisherman leaving his home, wife, and son to be a soldier for a cause he believes is righteous. He thanks god for strength, family, and wind at his back that help him do what he might otherwise lack the strength to do. 
"The Lords Prayer"  sung with mandolin and guitar accompaniment. 
"Intent On Contentment"
"Palo Escopeta"
"Heart That I Found"
"Land That Time Forgot"
"Rosa Bella" written after hearing the name of an Aspen woman, Rose Abello. 
"Mr. Bo Dietl" is a rewrite of Mr Bojangles to honor of "Bo" Dietl, a former New York City Police Department detective and a media personality known for contributing on the Fox News Network and Imus in the Morning.  
"Skunk's Night Out" uses the F-ing word throughout, but in a lighthearted manner. It talks about the spring when the skunks start mating and how it affects him the same way.

References
All information from album liner notes, unless otherwise noted.

2004 albums
Jimmy Ibbotson albums